Fernando Walls (6 February 1931 – 28 April 2005) was a Mexican chemist and sports shooter. He competed at the 1972 Summer Olympics and the 1976 Summer Olympics.

References

1931 births
2005 deaths
Mexican male sport shooters
Olympic shooters of Mexico
Shooters at the 1972 Summer Olympics
Shooters at the 1976 Summer Olympics
Place of birth missing
20th-century Mexican people